José Luis Corta (born 25 April 1949) is a Spanish rower. He competed in the men's double sculls event at the 1980 Summer Olympics.

References

1949 births
Living people
Spanish male rowers
Olympic rowers of Spain
Rowers at the 1980 Summer Olympics
Place of birth missing (living people)